Frederick Heinrich of Saxe-Zeitz-Pegau-Neustadt (21 July 1668 in Moritzburg – 18 December 1713 in Neustadt an der Orla), was a German prince of the House of Wettin.

He was the fourth (but third surviving) son of Maurice, Duke of Saxe-Zeitz, and his second wife, Dorothea Maria of Saxe-Weimar.

Life
In Öls on 23 April 1699, Frederick Henry married Sophie Angelika of Württemberg-Oels. Shortly after, his older brother, Duke Moritz Wilhelm, Duke of Saxe-Zeitz, gave him the towns of Pegau and Neustadt as appanage. From then on, he assumed the title duke of Saxe-Zeitz-Pegau-Neustadt (Herzog von Sachsen-Zeitz-Pegau-Neustadt). His wife Sophie died after only nineteen months of marriage on 11 November 1700.

In Moritzburg on 27 February 1702, Frederick married for a second time to Anna Fredericka Philippine of Schleswig-Holstein-Sonderburg-Wiesenburg. They had two children:

Maurice Adolph Charles (b. Moritzburg, 1 December 1702 - d. Pöltenberg, 20 June 1759), Duke of Saxe-Zeitz-Pegau-Neustadt (1713–18), Bishop of Hradec Králové (Königrgrätz) (1732) and Litoměřice (Leitmeritz) (1733–52),
Dorothea Charlotte (b. Moritzburg, 20 May 1708 - d. Moritzburg, 8 November 1708).

The death of his nephew, the Hereditary Duke Frederick August, on 17 February 1710, made him the heir apparent of the duchy of Saxe-Zeitz, because his immediate older brother Christian August was a priest.

Nevertheless, he died three years later, five before his brother Maurice Wilhelm. His only son, Maurice Adolf Karl, succeeded him in Pegau-Neustadt, but, still a minor, he was placed under the custody of his uncle Maurice Wilhelm and became the new heir apparent of Saxe-Zeitz. However, soon afterwards (1718) the young Maurice Adolf himself became a priest and renounced his claims to the duchy, which made the extinction of the Saxe-Zeitz line inevitable.

Without other male heirs, Zeitz was finally merged into the Electorate of Saxony after the death of Maurice Wilhelm.

External links
ollständige geographische Beschreibung zu einem Atlante Saxonico (in German) [retrieved 7 October 2014].
Neueste Geschichte des Königreichs Sachsen seit dem Prager Frieden bis auf ... (in German) [retrieved 7 October 2014].

1668 births
1713 deaths
House of Wettin
People from Moritzburg
Dukes of Saxe-Zeitz
Albertine branch